Pseudoceros bifurcus is a marine flatworm species that belongs to the family Pseudocerotidae.

Common name 
Racing stripe flatworm, orange-band flatworm, orange tipped flatworm.

Distribution 
Tropical Indo-Pacific, from eastern coast of Africa to Micronesia.

Habitat 
Internal slope or top from coral reef.

Size 

Physical characteristics 
"Dorsal surface with a background varying from green-bluish to cream with an intense purple margin without forming a distinctive marginal band. There is orange elongated spot beginning at the cerebral eyespot fading into a white median stripe that ends close to the posterior margin. Cream pseudotentacles formed by simple folds of the anterior margin with numerous ocella. A single cerebral cluster formed by about 30 eyes. Pharynx with elaborated folds."

Behavior 

Benthic, diurnals, because of its aposematic colors, it has no fear to crawl around to feed.

External links 
 Life desk, Pseudoceros bifurcus 
 Discover Life, Pseudoceros bifurcus

Bibliographical references 
 Leslie Newman & Lester Cannon, "Marine Flatworms",CSIRO publishing,2003,
 Neville Coleman, "Marine life of Maldives",Atoll editions,2004,
 Andrea & Antonnella Ferrrari,"Macrolife",Nautilus publishing,2003,

Turbellaria
Animals described in 1989